Buckenham railway station is on the Wherry Lines in the east of England, serving the village of Buckenham in Norfolk. Its three-letter station code is BUC.

The station was opened in 1844. Today it is managed by Greater Anglia. According to usage estimates, Buckenham is one of the least-used stations in the country, registering just 216 passenger entries/exits in 2018/19. A limited number of services stop at the station.  The station buildings are currently used as a recording studio.

RSPB Buckenham Marshes is located next to the station, with RSPB Strumpshaw Fen a short walk away. Strumpshaw Hall Steam Museum is also located in the area.

History
The Bill for the Yarmouth & Norwich Railway (Y&NR), the first public railway line in Norfolk, received Royal Assent on 18 June 1842. Work started on the line in April 1843 and it opened on 1 May 1844. In June 1845 the Y&NR was amalgamated with the Norwich & Brandon Railway and Buckenham station became a Norfolk Railway asset.

The Eastern Counties Railway (ECR) and its rival the Eastern Union Railway (EUR) were both sizing up the Norfolk Railway to acquire and expand their networks. The ECR took over in May 1848 and in August 1862 all railways in East Anglia were consolidated to form the Great Eastern Railway (GER). The Railways Act 1921 led to the creation of the Big Four companies and the GER amalgamated with several companies to form the London and North Eastern Railway (LNER). Buckenham became an LNER station on 1 January 1923. Upon nationalisation in 1947 the station became part of the Eastern Region of British Railways

In 1997 the privatisation of British Rail saw the station and its services were transferred to Anglia Railways, which operated it until 2004 when National Express East Anglia won the replacement franchise. In 2012 Abellio Greater Anglia won the franchise.

In 2018 several scenes in Danny Boyles film Yesterday were filmed at the station.

Services
,there is one train to Norwich and one to Lowestoft, on weekdays and Saturdays . On Sundays, four trains, in both directions, call at the station, with two trains to Great Yarmouth on the  branch of the line and two trains to Lowestoft.

References

External links 

 Buckenham - Least Used Station In Norfolk - 2018 YouTube video by Geoff Marshall documenting the facilities and services available at the station

Railway stations in Norfolk
DfT Category F2 stations
Former Great Eastern Railway stations
Greater Anglia franchise railway stations
Low usage railway stations in the United Kingdom
Railway stations in Great Britain opened in 1844